Boos is a former commune in the Landes department in Nouvelle-Aquitaine in southwestern France. On 1 January 2017, it was merged into the commune Rion-des-Landes.

Population

See also
Communes of the Landes department

References

Former communes of Landes (department)